Arif Masood is an Indian politician associated with the Indian National Congress. He is a member of Madhya Pradesh Legislative Assembly representing 153 Bhopal Madhya Assembly constituency. He was elected to the Madhya Pradesh Legislative Assembly for the first time as Indian National Congress MLA in year 2018. He is one of only two Muslim MLAs in the Madhya Pradesh.

After completing his Bachelor of Law from State Law College in 1998, Masood entered student politics while pursuing his Master’s at Government Benazeer College in 2000. He started his career in Congress party later switched to Samajwadi Party in 2003. However, he returned to Congress in 2007.

References

Madhya Pradesh politicians
Indian National Congress politicians from Madhya Pradesh
Barkatullah University alumni
Madhya Pradesh MLAs 2018–2023

Year of birth missing (living people)
Living people
Place of birth missing (living people)